Admiral of the Fleet Sir James Hawkins-Whitshed, 1st Baronet,  (1762 – 28 October 1849), was a Royal Navy officer. He saw action in command of a sloop at the Battle of Martinique during the American Revolutionary War. He went on to serve under Sir John Jervis in the Mediterranean and took part in the battle of Cape St. Vincent during the French Revolutionary Wars.

After promotion to flag-officer rank Hawkins-Whitshed became Commander-in-Chief of the Sea Fencibles in Ireland and then Commander-in-Chief of the Cork Station during the Napoleonic Wars. After the War with France was won he served as Commander-in-Chief, Portsmouth.

Early life
Hawkins was born simply James Hawkins in Raphoe, County Donegal, in Ulster, the third son of The Rt Rev. Dr James Hawkins, Church of Ireland Lord Bishop of Raphoe, and his wife, Catherine Keene Hawkins.

American War
The first ship in which Hawkins actually served at sea was the 20-gun sixth-rate , commanded by Captain William Bennett, whom he accompanied to Newfoundland in 1775. He was then assigned to the frigate , under Captain Charles Fielding. In May 1776, Diamond escorted a convoy carrying a large detachment of British and foreign troops to America. On his arrival back in England he was appointed to the frigate , where he remained until the end of 1779. He then served aboard the 90-gun ship , the flagship of Admiral Sir George Rodney. Hawkins consequently saw action in the capture of the Caracas Company convoy on 8 January 1780, and the "Moonlight Battle" on 16 January, when Rodney defeated a Spanish squadron under Don Juan de Lángara off the southern coast of Portugal.

Hawkins was promoted to commander on 10 February 1780, and given command of the 14-gun sloop  (formerly the Spanish San Vicente of the Caracas Company) and sailed with Rodney from Gibraltar to the West Indies, seeing action again in the Battle of Martinique on 17 April 1780. On the day after the battle, on 18 April, he was promoted to captain and given command of the 20-gun frigate . Deal Castle and the sloop-of-war  were anchored in Gros Islet Bay, Saint Lucia, when in early October 1780 the "Great Hurricane" struck the island. The two ships made for the relative safety of the open sea, but Deal Castle was wrecked on the coast of Puerto Rico. Three of the crew were killed, but the rest escaped on rafts to the safety of the land. They were promptly imprisoned by the Spanish, and held for two months, before being released and sent to Tortola. Hawkins made his way to St. Eustatia, where he found Admiral Rodney. Having passed the ordeal of a court-martial for the loss of his ship, he returned to England in a packet with despatches from the Admiral.

Hawkins was appointed to command of the newly built 32-gun fifth-rate  at Liverpool in July 1781. Ceres returned to America in May 1782, conveying Sir Guy Carleton, the new Commander-in-Chief, North America to his command. Ceres remained in America until its final evacuation in December 1783, when Hawkins returned to England, where in February 1784, Ceres was paid off. Hawkins took advantage of the peace to attend lectures in astronomy at the University of Oxford in 1786, and travelled extensively throughout Europe, visiting The Hague, Hamburg, Lübeck, Reval, Saint Petersburg, Copenhagen, and Paris.

In 1791, following the provisions of a will of his cousin James Whitshed, Hawkins added the surname of his maternal grandmother, Whitshed, to his own, in order to inherit properties that had once belonged to the Lord Chief Justice of Ireland William Whitshed. On 11 December 1791 Hawkins-Whitshed married Countess Sophia Henrietta Bentinck, the daughter of Captain John Bentinck.

War with France

In June 1793, after the outbreak of war with Revolutionary France, Hawkins-Whitshed was appointed to command of the 74-gun ship , on the home station. In March 1795, he moved to the 90-gun second-rate ship of the line , and after cruising for some time with the Channel Fleet, sailed with Rear Admiral William Parker to reinforce Sir John Jervis in the Mediterranean. On 14 February 1797, Hawkins-Whitshed took part in the battle of Cape St. Vincent, where Jervis gained a notable victory over a Spanish fleet. Hawkins-Whitshed, with the rest of the officers of the squadron, received the thanks of Parliament, and was presented with a gold medal. Hawkins-Whitshed returned to England, where in January 1798 he was appointed to the 80-gun ship , but after only six months was transferred to the 98-gun , in which he remained after his promotion to the rank of rear admiral on 14 February 1799.

Senior command
Upon the death of Sir Charles Thompson in March 1799, Hawkins-Whitshed hoisted his flag on board the 110-gun first-rate ship  and sailed for the Mediterranean. He soon returned to England, with his flag in the second-rate , and joined the Channel Fleet in November 1799. He remained there until the temporary peace occasioned by the Treaty of Amiens in March 1802. On the recommencement of hostilities in May 1803, Hawkins-Whitshed was appointed Commander-in-Chief of the Sea Fencibles in Ireland, receiving promotion to the rank of vice admiral on 23 April 1804. Hawkins-Whitshed was present at the funeral of Lord Nelson in January 1806. In early 1807 he replaced Lord Gardner as Commander-in-Chief on the Cork Station, remaining there until late 1810. He was promoted to the rank of admiral on 31 July 1810.

On 2 January 1815 Hawkins-Whitshed was made a Knight Commander of the Order of the Bath (KCB), receiving the award from the Prince Regent at Carlton House, on 11 April 1815. In February 1821, following the sudden death of Sir George Campbell, he was appointed Commander-in-Chief, Portsmouth serving there until March 1824. On 17 November 1830 he was advanced to Knight Grand Cross of the Order of the Bath (GCB), receiving the award on 1 December 1830.

On 1 May 1834 Hawkins-Whitshed was made a baronet of the United Kingdom of Great Britain and Ireland, of Killincarrick, in the county of Wicklow, and of Jobstown, in the county of Dublin, and the heirs "male of his body lawfully begotten." He received promotion by seniority to the highest rank in the navy, Admiral of the Fleet, on 8 January 1844. Hawkins-Whitshed died at his home in Cavendish Square, London, on 28 October 1849.

Family
Hawkins-Whitshed and his wife, Sophia, had two sons and four daughters. Their second son, St. Vincent Keene Hawkins-Whitshed (1801–1870), succeeded his father as baronet.

See also
 
 Hawkins-Whitshed baronets
 Elizabeth Hawkins-Whitshed

References

Sources

 

 

|-

1762 births
1849 deaths
18th-century Anglo-Irish people
19th-century Anglo-Irish people
People from Raphoe
Baronets in the Baronetage of the United Kingdom
Royal Navy admirals of the fleet
Knights Grand Cross of the Order of the Bath
Royal Navy personnel of the French Revolutionary Wars
Royal Navy personnel of the Napoleonic Wars
Royal Navy personnel of the American Revolutionary War